Khapsey are cookies or biscuits in Tibetan cuisine that are deep fried and usually made during celebrations such as the Losar (Tibetan New Year) or weddings. Khapseys are fashioned into many different intricate shapes and textures. Some are sprinkled with powdered sugar, while other shapes, such as the donkey ear-shaped khapseys, decorative.

See also
 List of deep fried foods
 List of Tibetan dishes

References

Tibetan cuisine
Deep fried foods
Biscuits